Cheontaesan is a 631-meter-high mountain in Gyeongsangnam-do, South Korea, on the border between Miryang and Yangsan cities.  It lies near the southern end of the Yeongnam Alps, and looks south across the Nakdong River to Gimhae.  Cheontaesan is connected to Geumosan to its north.

Tourists reach the mountain's southern flank on the local highway which crosses from Wondong-myeon in Yangsan to Samnangjin-eup in Miryang.  There are numerous waterfalls on Cheontaesan.  These include the Ungyeon waterfall, which lies on the southern flank just below the Cheontaeho reservoir.  The Cheontaesa Buddhist temple is also located on the southern flank.

The name "Cheontaesan" comes from the Cheontae Buddhist order, which was established here in the 7th century.

See also
List of mountains in Korea
Geography of South Korea
Tourism in South Korea

References

Mountains of South Korea
Mountains of South Gyeongsang Province
Miryang
Yangsan